Michael Habermann (born 1950 in Paris) is an American pianist and private piano instructor.

His intense study of the music of English-Parsi composer Kaikhosru Shapurji Sorabji has resulted in five recordings. Sorabji dedicated his piano piece Il grido del Gallino d'oro da Rimsky-Korsakov: variazioni frivole con una fuga anarchica, eretica e perversa (1978–79) to him. The topic of his dissertation was Sorabji, with whose music he is internationally associated.

Habermann made his New York debut in 1977 to rave reviews and has since given numerous performances. His recitals have been heard on both the Voice of America and National Public Radio.

His repertoire includes numerous works from all periods. He has given many premieres of 20th-century works (Casella, Chávez, Fricker, Halffter, Leighton, Ponce, Rieti, Silvestre, Sorabji, Spier, etc.) and was the soloist in the world premiere (1975) of Eugene Glickman’s Concerto for Piano and Percussion. He has recorded an album of piano music by the Portuguese composer Alexandre Rey Colaço and other recordings are available.

Habermann now resides in the United States. He has lived in Canada (1957–62), Mexico (1962–72), and speaks fluent French and Spanish. His principal piano instructors have been Fernando Laires, Hilde Somer, and Carlos Vázquez. He also holds a master's degree in Composition from Long Island University (1979). In 1985 he was awarded a Doctorate by the Peabody Institute of the Johns Hopkins University.

His writings include a chapter in a book on Vladimir Horowitz edited by David Dubal and a chapter in Sorabji: A Critical Celebration, edited by Paul Rapoport.

As an educator he has had wide-ranging personal and classroom teaching experience with children, adults, and degree candidates (formerly at Morgan State University and Towson State University). He was a popular Peabody Elderhostel lecturer for many years and was also a sought-after juror for piano competitions. Currently he teaches privately, on a one-to-one basis.

He is a composer of instrumental, vocal, and piano works, and has written a number of piano transcriptions.

References

1950 births
Living people
French emigrants to the United States
Male classical pianists
21st-century classical pianists